Events from the year 1908 in Russia.

Incumbents
 Monarch – Nicholas II 
 Chairman of the Council of Ministers – Pyotr Arkadyevich Stolypin

Events

 
 
 
 
 
 1908 World Figure Skating Championships
 Bezdany raid
 1908 bombardment of the Majlis
 Russian Empire at the 1908 Summer Olympics
 Tunguska event

Births

Deaths

References

1908 in Russia
Years of the 20th century in the Russian Empire